National security of Serbia is a term encompassing the policies of Serbian national defense and foreign relations. Serbia is a militarily neutral country, with no intentions to join NATO.

Security agencies
During FR Yugoslavia, the State Security Service (SDB/RDB) was the security agency within the Ministry of the Interior that aimed to protect the country from internal threats. It succeeded the State Security Administration (UDBA).

Currently, there are several security agencies active in Serbia. These include the Security Intelligence Agency (BIA), the national intelligence agency, responsible for collecting, reporting and disseminating intelligence, and conducting counter-intelligence in the interest of Serbia's national security. Within the military, there are the Military Intelligence Agency (VOA) of the Ministry of Defence, Military Security Agency (VBA) of the Ministry of Defence and Intelligence and Reconnaissance Directorate (J-2) of the Serbian General Staff.

Kosovo War

NATO
 
 
The NATO intervention in Bosnia and Herzegovina in 1992–95 and the NATO bombing of Yugoslavia in 1999 resulted in strained relations between Serbia and NATO. Relations were further strained following Kosovo's declaration of independence in 2008 while a protectorate of the United Nations with security support from NATO. However, Serbia was invited and joined the Partnership for Peace programme during the 2006 Riga summit and in 2008, was invited to enter the intensified dialogue programme whenever the country is ready.

Serbia's Parliament passed a resolution in 2007 which declared their military neutrality until such time as a referendum was held on the issue. On 1 October 2008, Serbian Defence Minister Dragan Šutanovac signed the Information Exchange Agreement with NATO, one of the prerequisites for fuller membership in the Partnership for Peace programme. In April 2011 Serbia's request for an IPAP was approved by NATO, and Serbia submitted a draft IPAP in May 2013. The agreement was finalized on 15 January 2015.

A CeSID poll in June 2015 conducted with the support of the United States Agency for International Development (USAID) indicated that only 12 percent of those polled supported for NATO membership, down from 25 percent in 2012, and 73 percent were opposed. The minor Liberal Democratic Party and Serbian Renewal Movement remain the most vocal political parties in favor of NATO membership. Although Serbia aspires to join the European Union, Serbia may seek to maintain military neutrality, joining neither NATO nor the Collective Security Treaty Organization (CSTO).

Islamism and Islamic terrorism

See also
Defense industry of Serbia

References

Further reading
Savić, A., 2000. Uvod u državnu bezbednost: udžbenik. Viša škola unutrašnjih poslova.
Milošević, M., 2001. Sistem državne bezbednosti. Policijska akademija.
Đorđević, O.Ž., 1985. Osnovi državne bezbednosti: opšti deo. Viša škola unutrašnjih poslova.
Savić, A., Delić, M. and Ilić, P., 1998. Osnovi državne bezbednosti. Beograd, Viša škola unutrašnjih poslova. Obrazovno-istraživački centar.
Milan, M., 2001. Sistem državne bezbednosti, policijska akademija.
Atanasović, Z., 2008. „Javni nadzor politike bezbednosti “. Pojmovnik. Beograd: Centar za civilno-vojne odnose.
Mijatović, Z., 2004. Opelo za državnu tajnu: svedočenje iz vrha Državne bezbednosti. Pharos.
Sretenović, M., 2006. Uticaj geopolitičkih interesa velikih sila na bezbednost država Zapadnog Balkana. Beograd: ŠNO.

Political terminology of Serbia
Government of Serbia
Serbia
Security in Serbia